Eric I, Count of Hoya (1370-1426) was a German nobleman.  He was the ruling Count of Upper Hoya from 1377 until his death.

Life 
Eric was the son of Count John II and his wife Helen, a daughter of Duke Eric I of Saxe-Lauenburg.  His brother, John was Bishop of Paderborn from 1394 to 1399 and Bishop of Hildesheim from 1399 to 1424.  His brother Otto was Bishop of Münster from 1392 to 1424, and from 1410 to 1424 also administrator of Osnabrück

Eric inherited Upper Hoya in 1377.  He expanded the county to the south, at the expense of the Bishopric of Minden.  In 1383, he built a castle at Diepenau.  Bishop Wittekind II of Minden destroyed this castle a short time later.  He also destroyed the village of Uchte and its castle.  Eric retaliated by destroying Fischer, a suburb of Minden.  He reconquered Diepenau and Uchte and rebuilt the castles.

He expanded the county further by purchasing manors.

Marriage and issue 
In 1390, Eric married Helen, a daughter of Duke Magnus II Torquatus of Brunswick-Lüneburg.  The marriage produced six children:
 John V (d. 1466), succeeded his father as Count of Upper Hoya
 Albert (d. 1470), Bishop of Minden
 Otto (d. 1440), provost of St. Mary's Cathedral in Hamburg and administrator of the Archbishopric of Bremen
 Eric (d. 1458), provost of Cologne and administrator of the Bishopric of Osnabrück
 Helene (d. 1426), married Count Adolph VIII of Schauenburg and Holstein-Pinneberg
 Ermengard, married Count Otto VII of Tecklenburg

References 
 Heinrich Gade: Historisch-geographisch-statistische Beschreibung der Grafschaften Hoya und Diepholz, Nienburg, 1901
 Wilhelm Hodenberg (ed.): Hoyer Urkundenbuch, Hannover, 1848–1856
 Bernd Ulrich Hucker: Die Grafen von Hoya, Hoya, 1993
 Museum Nienburg: Die Grafschaften Bruchhausen, Diepholz, Hoya und Wölpe, Nienburg, 2000

Counts of Hoya
1370 births
1426 deaths
14th-century German nobility
15th-century German nobility